Sam Swank (born October 5, 1985) is a former American football placekicker. After playing college football for Wake Forest, he was signed by the Philadelphia Eagles as an undrafted free agent in 2009. 

He was also a member of the Cincinnati Bengals, New York Giants, Hartford Colonials, and Jacksonville Jaguars.

College career
After redshirting as a true freshman in 2004, Swank was a four-year starter at placekicker for Wake Forest and usually handled punting duties, as well.  As a sophomore in 2006, Swank was voted ACC Championship Game's Most Valuable Player, scoring all nine points in Wake Forest's 9–6 victory over Georgia Tech.  Swank finished his career as the all-time leading scorer at Wake Forest with 337 points, setting school records with 71 field goals and 124 career PATs.

Professional career

Philadelphia Eagles
Swank was signed as a free agent by the Philadelphia Eagles after being undrafted in the 2009 NFL Draft. He was waived on May 27, 2009.

Cincinnati Bengals
Swank signed with the Cincinnati Bengals on August 24, 2009 after placekicker Shayne Graham suffered a groin injury. He was waived during final cuts on September 5, 2009.

New York Giants
After spending the 2009 season out of football, Swank was signed to a future contract by the New York Giants on January 6, 2010. He was waived on June 11.

Hartford Colonials
Swank was signed by the Hartford Colonials of the United Football League on November 8, 2010.

Jacksonville Jaguars
Swank was signed by the Jacksonville Jaguars on August 9, 2011. He was waived on August 25. He was re-signed following the 2011 season on April 16, 2012. He was waived again on April 27.

References

External links
Just Sports Stats
Cincinnati Bengals bio
Wake Forest Demon Deacons bio

1985 births
Living people
Sportspeople from Lakeland, Florida
Players of American football from Florida
American football punters
American football placekickers
Wake Forest Demon Deacons football players
Philadelphia Eagles players
Cincinnati Bengals players
New York Giants players
Hartford Colonials players
Jacksonville Jaguars players